Good Sam is an American medical drama television series created by Katie Wech for CBS, starring Sophia Bush and Jason Isaacs, which premiered on January 5, 2022. In May 2022, the series was canceled after one season.

Premise 
Heart surgeon Dr. Samantha Griffith (Sophia Bush) becomes the top surgeon at  Lakeshore Sentinel Hospital after her boss and father, Dr. Rob Griffith (Jason Isaacs), falls into a coma. Her life becomes complicated when he awakens and wants to resume surgery, which means Samantha would be supervising him.

Cast

Main

 Sophia Bush as Dr. Sam Griffith, Cardiac Fellow and Interim Chief at Lakeshore Sentinel Hospital
 Jason Isaacs as Dr. Rob "Griff" Griffith, one of the country's best cardiothoracic surgeons, the hospital's current Chief Medical Officer and Sam's father
 Skye P. Marshall as Dr. Lex Trulie, Sam's best friend who is having an affair with Griff
 Michael Stahl-David as Dr. Caleb Tucker, Sam's ex and member of her team
 Omar Maskati as Dr. Isan M. Shah, a doctor on Sam's team
 Wendy Crewson as Vivian Katz, a former orthopedic surgeon, the hospital's former Chief Medical Officer, Sam's mother, and Griff's ex-wife
 Edwin Hodge as Malcolm A. Kingsley, part of the Kingsley Family Foundation, Lakeshore's main donor, and the hospital's new Director of Finance
 Davi Santos as Dr. Joey Costa, a doctor on Sam's team

Recurring
 Yanna McIntosh as Dr. Rhonda Glass
 Evan Parke as Byron Kingsley, Malcom's father
 Stephen Tracey as Tim Davis, Joey's boyfriend of five years
 Sendhil Ramamurthy as Asher Pyne, Vivian's husband
 Victoria Rowell as Tina Kingsley, Malcolm's mother
 Travis Van Winkle as Dr. Eric Kace
 Gerardo Celasco as Dr. Nick Vega

Special guest stars
 Hilarie Burton as Gretchen Taylor
 Bethany Joy Lenz as Amy Taylor

Episodes

Production

Development
On September 19, 2019, CBS put Good Sam into development. Writer Katie Wech produced the series with Jennie Snyder Urman through her Sutton St. Productions and CBS Television Studios.  In February 2020, the series was given a pilot order, with further development paused during the COVID-19 pandemic. On May 14, 2021, the show was given a series order. On May 12, 2022, CBS canceled the series after one season.

Casting
In February 2020, Sophia Bush was cast as lead role. In March 2020, Jason Isaacs joined the main cast. In January 2021, Skye P. Marshall and Michael Stahl-David were cast in starring roles. In February 2021, Edwin Hodge joined the cast in a starring role. In January 2022, it was reported that Sendhil Ramamurthy was cast in a recurring role while Hilarie Burton and Bethany Joy Lenz are set to guest star. In February 2022, Victoria Rowell joined the cast in a recurring role.

Filming
Principal photography for the series began on October 18, 2021 and concluded on March 24, 2022, in Oakville, Ontario.

Reception

Critical response
The review aggregator website Rotten Tomatoes reported a 63% approval rating with an average rating of 7.5/10, based on 8 critic reviews. Metacritic, which uses a weighted average, assigned a score of 56 out of 100 based on 5 critics, indicating "mixed or average reviews".

Ratings

References

External links 
 

CBS original programming
2020s American medical television series
2020s American workplace drama television series
2022 American television series debuts
2022 American television series endings
English-language television shows
Television series by CBS Studios
Television shows filmed in Ontario